The 2011 North Carolina Central Eagles football team represented North Carolina Central University in the 2011 NCAA Division I FCS football season. The Eagles were led by first-year head coach Henry Frazier III and played their home games at O'Kelly–Riddick Stadium. They were a member of the Mid-Eastern Athletic Conference (MEAC). They finished the season 2–9 overall and 1–7 in MEAC play to tie for ninth place.

Schedule

References

North Carolina Central
North Carolina Central Eagles football seasons
North Carolina Central Eagles football